Stephanie Bruce ( Rothstein; born January 14, 1984) is an American long-distance runner.

Running career

NCAA
Stephanie Bruce smashed Katie Apenrodt's 10,000 meter UCSB school record by over a minute and a half in 2006 with her then 10 km PR of 33:27.85. Bruce is an NCAA Division 1 All-American, Big West Conference cross country champion, and league title-holder in the 5k and the 10k. She is also the 2006 Big West Conference Athlete of the Year, and 2006 NACAC Under-23 10,000 meters champion.

USATF
Bruce placed first with a time of 32:21 (her personal best 10k time), winning her first U.S. national title on July 4 at the 2018 AJC Peachtree Road Race which hosted the USATF 10km road championships, ahead of runner-up Aliphine Tuliamuk, Sara Hall and Allie Kieffer. This victory came two weeks after finishing 3rd at 10,000  meters on the track in 32:05.05 at 2018 USA Outdoor Track and Field Championships in Des Moines, Iowa at Drake University.

International career
She finished 19th at the 2010 IAAF World Half Marathon Championships. She won the 2012 Big Sur Half Marathon.

Bruce competed at the 2017 IAAF World Cross Country Championships, where she finished 22nd - the highest place for a non-African-born runner.

Bruce started her 2018 season with a 3rd place finish at the 2018 USA Cross Country Championships, led by Emily Infeld in 33:18.7 (3:19.9/km), Molly Seidel in 33:22.1, Bruce in 33:34.1, Infield's teammate Courtney Frerichs in 33:55.1, Emily Durgin in 33:56.9, and Susan Tanui in 34:39.0. The six qualified for Team USA at the 2018 NACAC Cross Country Championships in La Libertad, El Salvador on February 17, 2018. Throughout the entire race Bruce was among the leaders, and moved into 3rd after 4 km. Bruce maintained a pace of approximately 3:21/km.

In 2019, she competed in the senior women's race at the 2019 IAAF World Cross Country Championships held in Aarhus, Denmark. She finished in 33rd place.

In 2021, she finished 10th woman in the NY Marathon in a time of 2:31:05
<Track and Field Magazine>

Internet fame
Bruce gained fame for posting a photograph of her abdomen after giving birth that went viral.

Sponsorship
She is sponsored by Hoka One One while running for Northern Arizona Elite (NAZ Elite).

References

External links
 stephbruce.com (Personal site & Shop)
 

1984 births
Living people
American female long-distance runners
American female marathon runners
UC Santa Barbara Gauchos women's track and field athletes
21st-century American women